Morinia argenticincta is a species of cluster fly in the family Polleniidae.

Distribution
India, Nepal, Japan.

References

Polleniidae
Insects described in 1923
Diptera of Asia